WPHL-TV (channel 17) is a television station in Philadelphia, Pennsylvania, United States, affiliated with MyNetworkTV. The station is owned by Nexstar Media Group and has studios in the Wynnefield section of West Philadelphia; it maintains a channel sharing agreement with Vineland, New Jersey–licensed Univision station WUVP-DT (channel 65), under which the two stations transmit using WPHL-TV's spectrum from a tower in the Roxborough antenna farm.

WPHL-TV is the largest MyNetworkTV affiliate by market size that is not owned and operated by the Fox Television Stations subsidiary of Fox Corporation, which owns the programming service.

History

WPCA-TV
Radio station WKDN of Camden, New Jersey, received a construction permit for channel 17 as WKDN-TV on January 27, 1954. After not building the facility, the station sold the permit to the Young People's Church of the Air, owned by Percy Crawford, for $40,000 in February 1959. The call letters were changed to WPCA-TV, reflecting the name of his long-running broadcast ministry; the city of license was changed from Camden to Philadelphia in March 1960.

Promising a lineup of religious programs and family entertainment, the station signed on July 17, 1960, making it Philadelphia's first commercial UHF station.

WPCA-TV struggled amid the low penetration of UHF tuners prior to the 1964 passage of the All-Channel Receiver Act and Crawford's unexpected death in an October 1960 car accident. The station went silent August 1, 1962, having operated just two years.

The independent years
When channel 17 went silent, its sale was immediately announced to a consortium headed by attorney Aaron Jerome Katz and two real estate men. The station returned to the air on January 31, only to go dark again on June 14, when an application for the sale of channel 17 was finally filed with the Federal Communications Commission. The station's cameras were lent to WHYY-TV, the new public television station in Wilmington, Delaware, to allow that station to operate before a scheduled donation of equipment could be transferred and the station's own equipment did not function properly.

The Philadelphia Television Broadcasting Company, headed by Katz and advertising executive Len Stevens, was approved to purchase the station in mid-1964. After receiving approval to boost its effective radiated power from 12,000 to 626,000 watts, the new owners returned channel 17 to the air on September 17, 1965, as independent station WPHL-TV. It was the third UHF independent to sign-on in Philadelphia that year, two and a half weeks after WKBS-TV (channel 48) and four months after WIBF-TV (channel 29, later WTAF and now WTXF-TV). After merging with U.S. Communications Corporation in 1967 WPHL-TV became the flagship station for their station group. U.S. Communications also operated WATL in Atlanta, WPGH-TV in Pittsburgh, WXIX-TV in Cincinnati and KEMO-TV now (KOFY-TV) in San Francisco. The station produced and aired numerous local television shows over the years, including kids' favorite the Wee Willie Webber Colorful Cartoon Club and Dr. Shock's back-to-back shows Mad Theater and Horror Theater.

In the summer of 1975, WPHL-TV moved from its original studio facility at 1230 East Mermaid Lane in the suburb of Wyndmoor, which had been the station's base since its 1960 debut, to its current studio on Wynnefield Avenue in the Wynnefield suburb of West Philadelphia. The building had once been the location of an A&P supermarket. The station offered a schedule of off-network drama series, sitcoms, old movies, sports and religious programs. It also ran NBC and ABC programs that KYW-TV (channel 3, now a CBS owned-and-operated station) and WPVI-TV (channel 6) had respectively preempted until the fall of 1976, and again from the fall of 1977 to the summer of 1983. The Providence Journal Company bought channel 17 in 1979. At that point, WPHL sought a different programming strategy geared towards adults, gradually dropping children's programming and cartoons. It focused more on movies, off-network drama series, recent off-network sitcoms and sports. The station also aired several hours of religious programming each day.

Throughout the late 1970s and 1980s, WPHL was known on-air as "The Great Entertainer," with voiceovers provided by announcer Sid Doherty. The station positioned itself as an alternative to both WTAF and WKBS, as it programmed more towards adults with movies and other syndicated programs, while its competitors were heavy on sitcoms and children's cartoons. WPHL was also a station heavy on local sports, as it aired games featuring Major League Baseball's Philadelphia Phillies until 1982, the NBA's Philadelphia 76ers from 1982 to 1995 and the NHL's Philadelphia Flyers in the 1990s.

From October 1981 to August 1987, the WPHL studios hosted a weekday afternoon dance show called Dancin' On Air, hosted by Eddie Bruce, as well as a spin-off on the USA Network called Dance Party USA, whose host, Dave Raymond, was better known as the Phillie Phanatic mascot seen during Phillies games. Those shows marked the on-air debut of a young girl from nearby Voorhees, New Jersey named Kelly Ripa.

In the summer of 1982, WKBS went on the market after its owner, Field Communications, decided to exit broadcasting. The Providence Journal Company was among those who were bidding for channel 48's license. Had it won, Journal would have merged WPHL's and WKBS' schedules under the WKBS license and channel allocation, while selling the channel 17 license to either a religious or educational broadcaster. However, the Journal Company's bid was still far below Field's asking price. With no takers willing to give Field what it wanted for the station, WKBS-TV ceased operations one year later on August 29, 1983, and WPHL picked up various syndicated programs, cartoons, movies and production equipment from WKBS.

In 1987, the Providence Journal Company sold WPHL-TV to a consortium headed by Dudley S. Taft, a third-generation broadcaster from Cincinnati. Dudley Taft had left his family's namesake company following a corporate restructuring which resulted in the firm changing its name to Great American Broadcasting. He also brought along key personnel from Taft's former Philadelphia station, WTAF-TV (which Taft had sold to TVX Broadcast Group in early 1987), including general manager Randy Smith. The new ownership scrapped the "Great Entertainer" slogan and related logo for a new identity as "PHL 17", in an apparent attempt to counter WGBS-TV's (channel 57, now WPSG) "Philly 57" branding. The new owners restored some cartoons to the schedule. In 1991, the Taft group sold channel 17 to the Tribune Company.

The WB affiliation
On November 2, 1993, Tribune and the Warner Bros. Television division of Time Warner announced the formation of The WB Television Network. Due to the company's minority interest in the network (initially 12.5%, before expanding to 22%), Tribune chose to affiliate the majority of its independent stations with the upstart network, resulting in WPHL-TV becoming a network affiliate for the first time in its history upon The WB's January 11, 1995 debut. In September of that year, the station changed its on-air identity to "WB 17". For most of The WB's run, WPHL was one of the network's strongest affiliates.

Switch to MyNetworkTV
On January 24, 2006, CBS Corporation (which split from Viacom in December 2005) and Time Warner's Warner Bros. Entertainment (the division that operated The WB) announced that they would dissolve UPN and The WB and merge both networks' stronger programming onto a newly created network, The CW. Concurrent with the announcement, it signed a ten-year affiliation agreement with 16 of Tribune's 19 WB-affiliated stations. However, in the case of Philadelphia, The CW's affiliation went to the city's UPN station, CBS-owned WPSG (which was part of an affiliation deal with 11 of CBS' UPN stations). It would not have been an upset had WPHL been chosen as the area's CW affiliate, however. The network's officials were on record as preferring The WB and UPN's "strongest" stations for their new network, and Philadelphia was one of the few markets where the affiliates of both networks were both relatively strong.

WPHL was slated to revert to its previous independent status, but on May 15, 2006, Tribune announced that it would affiliate channel 17 (and two other WB affiliates that were not included in the CW affiliation deal) with MyNetworkTV, making WPHL the largest station in terms of market size affiliated with the network that was not owned by its then-parent company News Corporation (which became 21st Century Fox in June 2013 after spinning off most of its non-entertainment properties). It is also the only major station in Philadelphia that is not owned by its respective network. In July, WPHL rebranded itself as "MyPHL17", reviving the station's former "PHL 17" moniker. WPHL began airing MyNetworkTV programming on the day that the new service was launched, September 5, 2006. As a result, it did not air the final two weeks of The WB's programming.

On October 4, 2010, the station removed the "My" portion of the branding as many affiliates of the network began dropping references to MyNetworkTV due to it becoming more of a prime time programming service than a true television network. WPHL retains the multi-shaded 'blue TV' component of the network's logo as part of the station's own logo. Before the move of the broadcast rights of the Phillies in 2014 to WCAU-TV, another version of the logo was used where the "p" in "phl" was replaced with the hat insignia "P" from the logo of the Philadelphia Phillies. In addition, the Antenna TV subchannel the station carries is branded with a modified version of their 1970s/80s "Great Entertainer" logo; many other Antenna TV stations do this as well.

Aborted sale to Sinclair; sale to Nexstar

Sinclair Broadcast Group entered into an agreement to acquire Tribune Media on May 8, 2017, for $3.9 billion, plus the assumption of $2.7 billion in Tribune debt. The deal received significant scrutiny over Sinclair's forthrightness in its applications to sell certain conflict properties, prompting the FCC to designate it for hearing and leading Tribune to terminate the deal and sue Sinclair for breach of contract.

Following the Sinclair deal's collapse, Nexstar Media Group of Irving, Texas, announced its purchase of Tribune Media on December 3, 2018, for $6.4 billion in cash and debt. The sale was completed on September 19, 2019.

Local programming

Sports programming
After the station joined The WB, it released many of its sports contracts in order to concentrate on its network programming obligations.

The station aired syndicated college football and basketball games from the syndication arm of ESPN involving the Mid-American Conference (football, owing to Temple being a football-only member of the league) and Big East Conference (basketball) until 2009, when WPVI took over rights. WPHL also aired Big Ten Conference games (owing to Penn State's large fan base in the area) until the creation of the Big Ten Network on cable in 2007.

WPHL has aired preseason games of the NFL's Philadelphia Eagles. Also, it usually wins the rights to air one or two regular season Eagles games on Monday or Thursday nights due to the NFL's anti-siphoning rule requiring games airing on cable to be available on an over-the-air station in each team's home market; by rule, the NFL sells syndication rights of local teams' games. The station's news partner, WPVI-TV, has the right of first refusal on Monday night games due to its parent company (Disney) being majority owner in ESPN, but generally defers to standard ABC programming.

From 2018 season until the 2022 season, WPHL and WPVI share local broadcast rights to the Philadelphia Union of Major League Soccer. WPVI produces the telecasts.  The contract ended when MLS terminated all regional television deals, replacing them with one single Apple TV+ contract.

As of the 2018–2019 season, WPHL covers the Philadelphia Wings of the National Lacrosse League, carrying all home games and select away games.

Newscasts

In 1994, WPHL entered into an agreement with local daily newspaper The Philadelphia Inquirer to broadcast an Inquirer-branded prime time news program. The half-hour Inquirer News Tonight was a hybrid newscast that integrated the conventions of a typical television news program with contributions from the newspaper's personnel. However, the format failed to make any headway against WTXF's established prime time newscast; behind-the-scenes issues with Knight-Ridder (the Inquirers owner at that point), including newspaper staffers' wariness of being on TV and compensation and contract issues, as well as general mismanagement, doomed the program. Another blow occurred in October 1995 when weekend weatherman Bill Elias was fired following the revelation of his involvement with a local crime family (he had given mob boss John Stanta's bodyguards a videotape of a mob funeral in 1993, to pick targets from another crime family to kill); he had previously lost his job at WTXF over this. WPHL took full control of the newscast, changing to the WB 17 News at Ten in late 1996.

Even after WPHL took its newscast in-house, it still remained far behind WTXF in the ratings.  In the fall of 2005, WPHL announced that its news department would be shut down; the final 10 p.m. newscast produced by WPHL aired on December 9, 2005. The following day, production of the 10 p.m. newscast was turned over to NBC O&O WCAU through a news share agreement. This newscast was partially renamed to WB 17 News at 10, Powered by NBC 10. On July 25, 2006, the program was renamed My PHL 17 News, Powered by NBC 10 to correspond with WPHL's upcoming switch to MyNetworkTV. On December 10, 2008, WCAU began broadcasting its local newscasts in high definition, and the WPHL newscast was also included in the HD upgrade. The newscast was renamed once again on October 4, 2010 as phl17 News at 10, Powered by NBC 10.

On October 31, 2011, WPHL began airing Eye Opener, a morning news program concept by Tribune Broadcasting that originally debuted in May 2011 on Houston sister station KIAH, featuring a mix of news, lifestyle, entertainment and opinion segments. Local news, weather, and traffic segments are featured along with local reports presented by five multimedia journalists; however, much of EyeOpener (which was previously produced at Tribune Company's Chicago headquarters) is pre-produced at the studios of Dallas–Fort Worth sister station KDAF and is also distributed on Tribune-owned stations in three other markets that provide their own localized content.

The WCAU-produced 10 p.m. newscast ended on September 14, 2012, with WPHL entering into a new agreement with the ABC owned-and-operated station WPVI-TV to produce the new Action News at 10 on PHL17. The weekday editions of the newscast are currently anchored by Sharrie Williams and Gray Hall. Williams became the sole anchor of the broadcast on January 12, 2022 when her co-anchor of the 5 p.m. newscast on WPVI, Rick Williams (no relation), was promoted to anchor of the 11 p.m. newscast replacing long-time anchor Jim Gardner. Gardner stepped down from the broadcast after 45 years to begin a semi-retirement in which he would only anchor the 6 p.m. newscast until fully retiring from WPVI on December 21 after anchoring his final 6 p.m. newscast and handing it off to his successor Brian Taff, who started the next evening. Hall was the weekend morning anchor on WPVI until March 2022 when he was chosen to become Sharrie Williams' co-anchor for the 10 p.m. newscast exclusively. The weekend editions use the same staff (anchors Walter Perez and Jillian Mele, sports anchor Jamie Apody and meteorologist Brittany Boyer) as WPVI's weekend evening newscasts. It is the third ABC owned-and-operated station to be involved in a news share agreement, following KGO-TV in San Francisco (which produces independent station KOFY-TV's 9 p.m. newscast) and WTVD in Durham (which produced CW affiliate WLFL's 10 p.m. newscast until June 27, 2022,) and was later joined in 2014 by KABC-TV in Los Angeles (which produces independent station KDOC-TV's 7 p.m. newscast). On September 8, 2014, the newscast was expanded to an hour, making it only the second hour-long 10 p.m. newscast in Philadelphia other than that of competitor WTXF. While competitor station WPSG also has an hour-long newscast, CBS News Philadelphia NOW on The CW Philly, it is a hybrid local/national news program and not fully produced locally like Action News at 10 on PHL17.

On March 9, 2015, WPHL launched a half hour 5:30 a.m. newscast produced independently called The PHL17 Morning News. It is the first in-house newscast since the closure of their former news department at the end of 2005. The station's news studio was rebuilt, and the tri-caster formerly used was replaced with switchers, along with other equipment. The team then started producing independent news reports for the Delaware Valley.

On October 22, 2018, PHL17 Morning News expanded to a three-hour newscast from 5 to 8 a.m., when Eye Opener, which had changed its name to Morning Dose, was canceled. In September 2019, PHL17 Morning News expanded again by an additional hour to run from 5 to 9 a.m.

Notable current on-air staff
 Walter Perez (anchor)

Notable former on-air staff
 Vernon Odom (general assignment reporter)
 Lisa Thomas-Laury (feature reporter)

Technical information

Subchannels
The station's digital signal is multiplexed:

WPHL-TV's broadcasts became digital only, effective June 12, 2009.

Out-of-market coverage
In Pennsylvania, WPHL was carried on Comcast cable systems in Harrisburg, York and Lancaster; however, it was not available in high definition. It was available on South Central Pennsylvania cable systems for four decades; indeed, for most of The WB's run, it was that market's default WB affiliate (the network's programming aired in off-hours on local station WPMT). On June 26, 2019, it was discontinued on those Comcast systems. It is also carried in Milford, Pike County (which is part of the New York City television market). In Maryland, WPHL is carried on cable in Cecil County.

In New Jersey, WPHL is carried in parts of Hunterdon, Middlesex, Monmouth, Somerset and Warren counties. It is available on Cablevision's analog service on its systems in Ocean and Monmouth counties. On Comcast in Ocean and southern Middlesex counties, WPHL was available in standard definition on digital cable 255. Comcast had carried the station on analog channel 17 until February 2008, when it was moved to digital only to "preserve bandwidth".  Comcast added WPHL's HD signal to its lineups in Ocean and Southern Middlesex counties, the borough of Roosevelt in Monmouth County and Lambertville in Hunterdon County on August 22, 2012 on digital channel 907. The station was removed from Comcast's Central New Jersey systems altogether on June 26, 2019, due to Fox invoking exclusivity, only allowing MyNetworkTV O&O WWOR-TV to be carried on those systems. WPHL's Antenna TV, This TV (both were already carried as subchannels of WPIX) and Tango Traffic (now GeoTraffic) subchannels were added to the provider's Southern Middlesex County system on November 27, 2012 (found with a rescan of a digital tuner) but have not been mapped into the Comcast digital boxes or DTAs. There is no satellite coverage of WPHL outside of the Philadelphia market.

During the 1970s and 1980s, WPHL was a regional superstation available in New York City and portions of Long Island, as well as the large majority of New Jersey. In New Jersey, WPHL was carried on alongside competitors WTAF, and until it shut down in 1983, WKBS. The station was also carried on Comcast on the former Adelphia system in the suburbs of Scranton until replaced with a local affiliate.

References

External links

Broadcast Pioneers of Philadelphia

PHL-TV
Nexstar Media Group
MyNetworkTV affiliates
Antenna TV affiliates
Court TV affiliates
Television channels and stations established in 1960
1960 establishments in Pennsylvania
Philadelphia Union broadcasters
Major League Soccer over-the-air television broadcasters